Miss Lorraine is a French beauty pageant which selects a representative for the Miss France national competition from the region of Lorraine. The first Miss Lorraine was crowned in 1962, although the title was not used regularly until 1985.

The current Miss Lorraine is Sarah Aoutar, who was crowned Miss Lorraine 2022 on 8 October 2022. Three women from Lorraine have been crowned Miss France:
Isabelle Krumacker, who was crowned Miss France 1973
Sophie Perin, who was crowned Miss France 1975
Sophie Thalmann, who was crowned Miss France 1998

Results summary
Miss France: Isabelle Krumacker (1972); Sophie Perin (1974); Sophie Thalmann (1997)
1st Runner-Up: Cynthia Tévéré (2004); Camille Chéyère (2008)
2nd Runner-Up: Norma Klein (1969)
4th Runner-Up: Flore Skoracki (1986); Justine Kamara (2016)
6th Runner-Up: Marylène Bergmann (1975); Sarah Aoutar (2022)
Top 12/Top 15: Florence Rose (1987); Betty Pierre (1991); Sandra Thiringer (2001); Emma Virtz (2018); Marine Sauvage (2021)

Titleholders

Notes

References

External links

Miss France regional pageants
Beauty pageants in France
Women in France